Pomatiopsis is a genus of amphibious snails with gills and an operculum, aquatic freshwater gastropod mollusks in the family Pomatiopsidae.

Pomatiopsis is the type genus of the family Pomatiopsidae.

Distribution 
The distribution of the genus Pomatiopsis includes the USA: West Coast of the United States, Midwestern United States and Eastern United States.

Description
In 1862, the American malacologist George Washington Tryon first defined this genus. Tryon's diagnosis reads as follows:

Species
There are four species within the genus Pomatiopsis:

 Pomatiopsis binneyi Tryon, 1863
 Pomatiopsis californica Pilsbry, 1899
 Pomatiopsis chacei Pilsbry, 1937
 Pomatiopsis cincinnatiensis (Lea, 1840)
 Pomatiopsis hinkleyi Pilsbry, 1896
 Pomatiopsis lapidaria (Say, 1817) - type species

Ecology 
Species in the genus Pomatiopsis are amphibious, living in humid habitats, on marshy ground and in periodically flooded soil (Pomatiopsis californica and Pomatiopsis lapidaria), in trickling water (Pomatiopsis binneyi) and on mud of streams (Pomatiopsis cincinnatiensis).

References
This article incorporates public domain text from the reference

Pomatiopsidae